Helliconia Summer is a novel by Brian Aldiss published in 1983.

Plot summary
Helliconia Summer is a novel in which the world of Helliconia experiences its intensely hot summer.

Reception
Dave Langford reviewed Helliconia Summer for White Dwarf #50, and stated that "Fine writing, unforgettable images: and hanging over it all, the doomy awareness of Helliconia-watchers in the orbiting Earth Station Avernus, who know and remind us that all this differs only in detail from the summer of the last Great Year."

Neil Gaiman reviewed Helliconia Summer for Imagine magazine, and stated that "Rich and romantic, the story of the world of Helliconia where the seasons take two thousand years to turn, and humans and the horned and shaggy phagor are locked in continual struggle, is one that continues to echo through the mind long after the last page of the book is finished."

Reviews
Review by Faren Miller (1983) in Locus, #272 September 1983 
Review by Frank Catalano (1984) in Amazing Stories, July 1984 
Review by Tom Easton (1984) in Analog Science Fiction/Science Fact, July 1984 
Review by Don D'Ammassa (1985) in Science Fiction Chronicle, #64 January 1985 
Review by Peter Caracciolo (1985) in Foundation, #35 Winter 1985/1986, (1986)

References

1983 novels